Concourse is the independent student newspaper of Keele University in Staffordshire, England. Its editorial team regularly update the paper online as well as putting together multiple physical editions during term time. It is editorially independent of both the university and the students' union and makes up the student media at the university, along with Kube Radio.

History

Concourse was first published in 1964, which makes it among the longest-running student publications in the UK.

Current

Concourse has a dedicated editorial team who update and maintain the paper's website as well maintained as well as creating multiple physical editions during term time. The paper reports news about Keele University and its sporting activities in addition to publishing local news, arts coverage, political matters and a variety of feature articles. Each edition of the newspaper is being printed in full colour along with articles being posted on the newspaper's website.

The  website contains articles published in the print editions, as well as additional content.

Concourse's Committee for 2021/22 are:

Editor-in-chief: Dan Pearson
Deputy editor-in-chief: Jordan Edwards
Treasurer: Ismail Hussain
Culture editor: Ismail Hussain
News editor: Jordan Edwards
Lifestyle editor: Erin Thomas 
Opinion editor: Will Drew
Sports editor: Dan Hill
Science and technology editor: Andrew Gregory
Sub-editor: Dylan Watson
Marketing manager: Dylan Watson

References

External links
Concourse
Official page: Keele University
Official page: Keele University Students' Union
Official Society page: Keele University Students' Union

1964 establishments in England
Keele University
Monthly newspapers
Publications established in 1964
Student newspapers published in the United Kingdom